Aaron Caratti (born 23 May 1980 in Perth, Western Australia) is an Australian racing driver. He progressed from karting to the Australian Formula Ford Championship before graduating to the Australian Formula 3 series where he became champion in 2005. Since then he has competed with moderate success in sports cars.

Career results

References

1980 births
Living people
Australian Formula 3 Championship drivers
Australian people of Italian descent
Racing drivers from Perth, Western Australia

Asian Formula Three Championship drivers